Huerfano River is a  tributary of the Arkansas River in Pueblo and Huerfano counties in Colorado, United States.

Description
The river flows from a source on Blanca Peak in the Sangre de Cristo Mountains of Colorado.  It joins the Arkansas in Pueblo County just south of the town of Boone. One major tributary is the Cucharas River.

The Huerfano River was named after the nearby Huerfano Butte. Huerfano is derived from a Spanish name meaning "orphan", so named from the butte's remote location.

See also

 List of rivers of Colorado

References

External links

Rivers of Colorado
Tributaries of the Arkansas River
Rivers of Huerfano County, Colorado
Rivers of Pueblo County, Colorado